Anton Door (20 June 18337 November 1919) was an Austrian pianist and music educator, also known in Russia as Anton Andreyevich Door.

Biography
Anton Door was born in Vienna and studied piano with Carl Czerny and theory with Simon Sechter. He began a concert career in 1850, touring as a soloist in Germany and Italy. He was appointed Court Pianist and a member of the Royal Academy in Stockholm, and taught for ten years at the Moscow Conservatory. From 1868-1901 he taught in Vienna at the Gesellschaft der Musikfreunde. He served as president of the Friends of Brahms Society and instituted the organization's concert series. Door was known for emphasis on technical ability, and notable students include Stephan Elmas, Robert Fischhof, Alexander von Zemlinsky, Fritz Steinbach and Laura Netzel. He died in Vienna. 

Pyotr Ilyich Tchaikovsky dedicated his Valse-Caprice, Op. 4 (1868) to Anton Door. Camille Saint-Saëns dedicated his Piano Concerto No. 4, Op. 44 (1875) to Anton Door. Paul Pabst dedicated his Piano Concerto Op. 82 (1885) to Anton Door.

References

External links

1833 births
1919 deaths
Musicians from Vienna
Austrian classical pianists
Male classical pianists
19th-century Austrian people
Austrian music educators
19th-century classical pianists
19th-century male musicians